Connor Joseph Querrard (born 6 April 2002) is a Virgin Islander footballer who plays as a goalkeeper for the Assumption College Greyhounds and the US Virgin Islands national football team.

Career

Youth career 
Querrard played at St. Benedict's Preparatory School, where he played football, volleyball, and basketball in addition to soccer.

College career 
After contemplating whether to play in the United States or stay in the U.S. Virgin Islands, Querrard decided to play college soccer in the U.S., as he signed to play at Assumption College in Massachusetts.

However, he did not make an appearance in his first season with the Greyhounds.

International career
Querrard joined the youth national team system by playing with the national under-15 team. He played in the 2018 CONCACAF U-20 Championship, as well as qualifiers for the 2019 CONCACAF U-17 Championship and 2020 CONCACAF Men's Olympic Qualifying Championship.

Querrard made his senior international debut on 19 November 2019, coming on as a late substitute for Lionel Brown in a 2-1 defeat to Saint Martin during CONCACAF Nations League play.

Career statistics

International

References

External links
 Assumption Greyhounds bio
 

2002 births
Living people
United States Virgin Islands soccer players
United States Virgin Islands international soccer players
United States Virgin Islands under-20 international soccer players
United States Virgin Islands youth international soccer players
Association football goalkeepers
Assumption Greyhounds men's soccer players